Rolando Illa (6 September 1880, New York City – 3 May 1937, Buenos Aires) was a Cuban–Argentine chess master.

Born in New York into a Cuban family, he moved to Argentina and was naturalized in 1904. He was a co-founder of the Club Argentino de Ajedrez in Buenos Aires. In 1910, he won Club Argentino Championship, and again in the period 1912–1919 (posteriormente) or 1913–1921. He won a match against Julio Lynch (3.5 : 1.5), and lost a match to Boris Kostić (0 : 6), both in Buenos Aires in 1913.

He shared 1st with C.M. Portela at Buenos Aires 1917, took 2nd, behind L. Carranza, at Buenos Aires 1920, tied for 2nd-4th at Montevideo (Carrasco) 1921/22 (South American Championship, Roberto Grau won), and took 5th at Buenos Aires 1922 (Pentagonal, Benito Villegas won). He thrice participated in the Argentine Championship: took 5th in 1921/22 (Damian Reca won), tied for 6-7th in 1923/24 and tied for 7-9th in 1924. Illa shared 2nd with Villegas, behind Alexander Alekhine, at Buenos Aires 1926.

References

External links
 

1880 births
1937 deaths
American chess players
Cuban chess players
Argentine chess players
Expatriates from Spanish Cuban in the United States
American sportspeople of Cuban descent
Cuban emigrants to Argentina